Daphne glomerata is a shrub, of the family Thymelaeaceae.  It is evergreen, and is found in Turkey and Caucasus.

Description
The shrub grows to a height of 20 cm and a width of 1 m.  It grows small white flowers, in clusters of up to 30, and red fruits.  It blooms from early to mid summer.

References

glomerata